Isthmiade martinsi is a species of beetle in the family Cerambycidae. It was described by Clarke in 2009.

References

Isthmiade
Beetles described in 2009